Wanted: A Husband is a 1919 American silent comedy film starring Billie Burke. It was produced by Famous Players-Lasky and distributed by Paramount-Artcraft. The film is based on the short story "Enter D'Arcy" by Samuel Hopkins Adams. The relatively unknown Lawrence C. Windom directed this lost film.

Plot
As described in a film magazine, Amanda "Darcy" Cole (Burke) is a normal young woman with a pleasing personality who, strangely enough, has no suitors. Her friends announce their engagements from time to time and each announcement giving her added cause for alarm. Gloria Green (Linden), an ardent physical culturist, tells Darcy where she is lax and she immediately begins training to improve her appearance. In the meantime she feigns an engagement with an unidentified Englishman. Her friends are invited to the country home of Tom Harmon (Lane) to spend their honeymoons. To the surprise of all, Darcy shows up with her Englishman, who in time is identified as the very American cousin of one of her friends. This leads to a happy ending.

Cast
Billie Burke as Amanda Darcy Cole
James Crane as Jack Remsen
Margaret Linden as Gloria Green
Charles Lane as Tom Harmon
Edward Lester as Paul Wood
Bradley Barker as Holcomb Lee
Helen Greene as Maude Raynes
Gypsy O'Brien as Helen Bartlett
Kid Broad as Andy Dunn
Mrs. Priestly Morrison as Veronica (aka Mary Florence Horne)
Frank Goldsmith as Hiram

References

External links

Coming attractions lantern slide to Wanted: A Husband
 lobby poster

American silent feature films
Lost American films
Famous Players-Lasky films
1919 comedy films
American black-and-white films
Silent American comedy films
1919 lost films
Lost comedy films
Films directed by Lawrence C. Windom
1910s American films